Campanulales is a valid botanic name for a plant order. It was used in the Cronquist system as an order within the subclass Asteridae in the class Magnoliopsida flowering plants. As then circumscribed it included the families:

 Pentaphragmataceae In Watson and Dallwitz this family has 1 genus, Pentaphragma with 30 species from southeast Asia.
 Sphenocleaceae - 1 genus
 Campanulaceae (harebells) - 28 genera
 Stylidiaceae In Watson and Dallwitz it has 5 genera and 150 species.
 Donatiaceae
 Brunoniaceae In Watson and Dallwitz there is only one species in the family, Brunonia australis
 Goodeniaceae (naupaka) - 1 genus

Campanulales is not recognized as an order in the APG II system, where the families are included in order Asterales, except for Sphenocleaceae in Solanales.

References 

 
 L. Watson and M.J. Dallwitz (1992 onwards). The families of flowering plants: descriptions, illustrations, identification, information retrieval. https://web.archive.org/web/20070103200438/http://delta-intkey.com/

Historically recognized angiosperm orders

az:Zəngçiçəklilər